Firuzabad (also Romanized as Fīrūzābād; also known as Feiz Abad and Feyẕābād) is a village in Rayen Rural District, Rayen District, Kerman County, Kerman Province, Iran. At the 2006 census, its population was 13, in 5 families.

References 

Populated places in Kerman County